The Leine Uplands is a region in Germany's Central Uplands which forms a part of the Lower Saxon Hills and lies along the River Leine between Göttingen and Hanover. It borders on the Weser Uplands in the west, the Innerste Uplands in the northeast, the Harz in the east and Untereichsfeld in the southeast.

Geography 

The Leine Uplands, which merge into the Weser Uplands to the east and the Harz to the west, are not a clearly defined landscape in terms of being a natural region but are nevertheless relatively easily delineated. Their extent from south to north is determined by the river that lends them their name and their extent from east to west by high ridges.

From north to south the uplands can be broadly divided into a southern half around the wide trough of the River Leine's middle course and a northern half by the lower reaches of the same river.

Landscapes either side of the Leine trough 

The River Leine flows from Friedland via Göttingen and Northeim to Einbeck through the Leine trough (Leine-Ilm Basin), an important north-south orientated geological rift valley. On the hilltops along the valley of the Leine there are many castles that controlled the north-south road network in the valley during the Middle Ages and could also block it entirely.

In the southeastern part of the Leine Uplands, east of the valley, is the plateau of the Göttingen-Northeim Forest which is founded on Bunter sandstone and Muschelkalk. The western edge of the forest (in a northerly direction) reaches from Friedland via Göttingen and Nörten-Hardenberg to Northeim. It is here that the largest group of abris in central Europe may be found. They are often located in the narrowest places in the ravine-like rocky valleys between the Leine and the Eichsfeld. In an area about 30 km long and 6 to 10 km wide around 1600 abris have been discovered. The woods (largely beech forests) are utilised by the forestry industry.

To the north this landscape transitions into the equally thickly wooded escarpments and fault-block landscape of the  Southwest Harz Foreland, in which Jurassic limestone is found alongside Bunter and Muschelkalk. Immediately north of Einbeck the Hube, an outlier of the Southwest Harz Foreland, reaches the western side of the Leine and "blocks" the Leine trough to the north.

West of the trough is the heath landscape of the latter opposite the intensively farmed Solling Foreland.

Not counted as part of the Leine Uplands is the extreme east of the Southwest Harz Foreland and the extreme northwest of the  Solling Foreland around the Vogler.

Alfeld Uplands 

After the Leine trough has been blocked and flows around the Hube, it runs through the Alfeld Uplands (Alfelder Bergland), also called the Ith-Hils Upland (Ith-Hils-Bergland), which is characterised by a succession of closely spaced ridges and finger valleys running in a northwest-southeast direction.

East of the massifs that give the region its alternative name, the Ith and the Hils, which are up to 480 m high, the ridges fall steeply on both sides of the Leine into the valley and are dissected by various tributaries. Beech woods dominate the heights whilst the valleys are used for arable farming.

Large areas of the countryside are protected. On the ridges east of the Leine, besides the mesophilic beech and ravine woods, there are xeric grasslands, dry bushlands, mesophilic grasslands and dry chalk hillside forests that are particularly worthy of conservation.

Near Gronau the Leine finally leaves the Leine Uplands and, simultaneously, the Central Uplands and enters funnel-shaped basin of the Calenberg Loess Börde which opens out into the North German Plain and which abuts on the Calenberg Uplands in the west and the Innerste Uplands and Hildesheim Forest  in the east.

Natural regions 

The landscape regions of the Leine Uplands are grouped into the following major units, whereby the numbers not prefixed by the letter D represent the old categorisation into major unit groups (double figures) and major units (triple figures), whilst the new major unit group, D 36, contains the two older groups.

D 36 Lower Saxon Hills
 37 Weser-Leine Uplands
 377 Alfeld Uplands (Ith-Hils ridges)
 371 Solling Foreland (less the extreme northwest which is part of the Vogler)
 372 Leine-Ilme Basin
 376 Southwest Harz Foreland (less the extreme east)
 373 Göttingen-Northeim Forest

Hills 
The following hills are counted as part of the Leine Uplands (roughly north to south):

Towns

Literature 
 Horst Vesterling: Das Leinebergland. Landschaft – Kultur – Freizeit. PDV-Sachbuchverlag, Hannover 1986. .
 Gerhard Kraus: Rund um die sieben Berge. Ein historischer Freizeitführer durch das Leinebergland. Harenberg, Hannover 1983. .
 Heinz Jordan: Geologische Wanderkarte Leinebergland. Maßstab 1:100.000. 1. Auflage. Verkehrsverein Leinebergland, Niedersächsisches Landesamt für Bodenforschung (Hrsg.), Hannover 1979.
 Verkehrsverein Leinebergland (Hrsg.): Leinebergland. Geschichte, Landschaft, Freizeit. Verkehrsverein Leinebergland, Alfeld (Leine) 1976.
 Arthur Rühl: Das südliche Leinebergland. Eine forstlich-vegetationskundliche und pflanzengeographische Studie. Pflanzensoziologie Band 9. Verlag G. Fischer, Jena 1954. 
 Bundesanstalt für Landeskunde und Raumforschung: Geographische Landesaufnahme 1:200000. Naturräumliche Gliederung Deutschlands. Die naturräumlichen Einheiten auf Blatt 86 Hannover. Bad Godesberg 1960
 Bundesanstalt für Landeskunde und Raumforschung: Geographische Landesaufnahme 1:200000. Naturräumliche Gliederung Deutschlands. Die naturräumlichen Einheiten auf Blatt 99 Göttingen. Bad Godesberg 1963
 Dr. Dietrich Flieder: Landeskunde Niedersachsen., 1. Auflage. Paul List Verlag, München 1970,  . S. 284 ff.

See also 
Leine Uplands region
Hödeken

References

External links 
 BfN-Landschaftssteckbriefe:
 Ith-Hils Uplands
 Solling Foreland
 Leine-Ilme Basin
 Southwest Harz Foreland
 Göttingen-Northeim Forest

 

Central Uplands
Regions of Lower Saxony
Hill ranges of Lower Saxony